Clough is a village in the civil parish of Bordwell in County Laois. It lies at a point where several townlands  and two civil parishes meet.

One of the churches of the Roman Catholic parish of Aghaboe, St. Canice, is located in  that part of the village which sits on that part of the townland of Chapelhill which lies in the civil parish of Bordwell.

References

Towns and villages in County Laois